The United Kingdom of Great Britain and Northern Ireland competed as Great Britain at the 1988 Winter Olympics in Calgary, Alberta, Canada.

Eddie "The Eagle" Edwards, representing Great Britain, achieved international fame for what the BBC described as "his brave but laughable attempts at ski-jumping".

Competitors
The following is the list of number of competitors in the Games.

Alpine skiing

Men

Men's combined

Women

Women's combined

Biathlon

Men

Men's 4 x 7.5 km relay

 1 A penalty loop of 150 metres had to be skied per missed target.
 2 One minute added per missed target.

Bobsleigh

Cross-country skiing

Men

 C = Classical style, F = Freestyle

Men's 4 × 10 km relay

Women

 C = Classical style, F = Freestyle

Figure skating

Men

Women

Pairs

Ice Dancing

Luge

Men

(Men's) Doubles

Women

Ski jumping

Speed skating

Men

References

Official Olympic Reports
International Olympic Committee results database
 Olympic Winter Games 1988, full results by sports-reference.com

Nations at the 1988 Winter Olympics
1988 Winter Olympics
Winter Olympics
Winter sports in the United Kingdom